"Got to Have Faith" is a 2004 single released by the Swedish heavy metal band Europe. It was released on September 15, 2004, and was the first single from the album Start from the Dark.

"Got to Have Faith" was co-written by vocalist Joey Tempest and guitarist John Norum, and was the first song written for Start from the Dark. "We wanted to make something modern, heavy and something that would be relevant now," Tempest said, "So John sent me some riffs to my hometown in London and I just started putting things together, writing lyrics and when I felt I had something, I sent it off to the other guys. They were all like, 'This is great!'... Hence the heavier riffs, the D-tuning and everything because that's the way John likes to do it."

The song's music video features the band performing in a garage interspersed with clips taken from the Ghost Rider motorcycle stunt films. In an interlude, the video shows brief, distorted clips of the band taken from the 1980s.

Personnel
Joey Tempest − vocals
John Norum − guitars
John Levén − bass guitar
Mic Michaeli − keyboards
Ian Haugland − drums

Chart positions

References 

2004 singles
Europe (band) songs
Songs written by Joey Tempest
2004 songs